Santiago Rusiñol i Prats (Barcelona 25 February 1861 – Aranjuez 13 June 1931) was a Spanish painter, poet, journalist, collector and playwright. He was one of the leaders of the Catalan modernisme movement. He created more than a thousand paintings and wrote numerous works in Catalan and Spanish.

Life and friends

He was born in Barcelona into a textile industrialist family from Manlleu, where they owned the textile mill town known as Can Ramissa. Santiago Rusiñol appears in the civil registry with the names of Jaume Jacint Lluís, rather than Santiago. Despite being the inheritor of the family business, he developed in his adolescence an interest in art which would go on to be his life's work.

On 19 June 1886, he married Lluïsa Denís i Reverter. The following year, his daughter, Maria Agustina, was born. A few months later, however, his restless nature, lack of interest in the family business, and desire to paint and travel led him to hand over the company's management to his brother Albert, a businessman and politician. Santiago thereafter began to travel through Catalonia, Spain, France, and Italy. Travel would go on to be a constant in his life.

In 1888, he established himself as a writer, regularly contributing to the newspaper La Vanguardia. In 1889 he broke off ties with his family, a rupture that lasted ten years, although he kept in touch with his daughter. That same year he went to study in Paris, where he lived on and off for the next decade.

In 1893 he set up his studio in Sitges, which today stands as the Cau Ferrat. Sitges became a modernist reference point for artists, writers and musicians, including Rusiñol, and modernist festivals, combining theatre, poetry, painting and music were organized there. He continued to write, chiefly narrative works and poems in prose. Some of his novels were adapted and performed in the theatre, such as L'auca del senyor Esteve, written in 1907 and released a few years later. In the first decade of the twentieth century, he consolidated his prestige as a prolific painter and writer, both in Barcelona and throughout Spain and Paris. In 1899, due to a severe illness, he was reunited with his wife. When he recovered, he returned to France with his family to detoxify from morphine addiction. He became an official member of the Paris Salon in 1908.

He was also part of the famous social gatherings of the Els Quatre Gats brewery on Carrer de Montsió in Barcelona run by Pere Romeu, a place of social gathering and an alternative art room, and frequented by a young Pablo Picasso. He maintained close friendships with the painter Ramon Casas and the sculptor Enric Clarasó until his death.

In the following two decades, his prestige grew in Barcelona despite disagreements with Noucentista artists and critics of the time (notably with the art critic Eugeni d'Ors, who wrote in the newspaper La Veu de Catalunya). In 1917, he was awarded the Legion of Honor by the French government.

He died in Aranjuez in 1931. Manuel Azaña, president of the Spanish Republic's provisional government, ordered an official funeral in Madrid. Rusiñol was later buried in Barcelona.

Pictorial artwork 

He studied at the studio of the painter Tomàs Moragas, where he learned drawing and various techniques, such as oil and watercolor. He first showed his work at the Sala Parés, in Barcelona, in 1879, in a collective exhibition; he would work with this gallery throughout his life. He also painting landscapes, figures, and literary scenes as opposed to the historical themes which at the time were fashionable.

His work often depicted depicting natural scenes of Catalan landscapes. He also painted scenes related to work and of the urban landscape, displaying characters in natural attitudes or engaged in their daily tasks. His work was generally well-received by critics of the time.

In 1888 he had his first solo exhibition in the Parés Gallery, published articles in the newspaper La Vanguardia, exhibited for the first time at the Paris Salon, and participated in the Barcelona World's Fair.

Gallery

See also
 List of Orientalist artists
 Orientalism

References

Further reading
 Vázquez, Oscar E.,  "Beauty Buried in its Own Cemetery: Santiago Rusiñol's 'Jardins d'Espanya' as Reliquaries of Aristocratic History."  Word & Image 2, no.1 (January–March, 1995), 61–76

External links
 

Web about the Rusiñol Year in Sitges
Santiago Rusiñol i Prats An extensive view on the life and works of Rusiñol as painter and writer

1861 births
1931 deaths
Burials at Montjuïc Cemetery
Painters from Catalonia
Catalan-language writers
Painters from Barcelona
Modernisme writers
Modernisme painters
Orientalist painters
Post-impressionist painters
Spanish dramatists and playwrights
Spanish male dramatists and playwrights
Spanish male poets
People of Montmartre